Gynatoma atra is a species of dance flies, in the fly family Empididae.

References

Empididae
Insects described in 1931
Diptera of Australasia
Taxa named by John Russell Malloch